Albdag was a Frisian count from the 9th century.

Albdag controlled the gouw Oostergo in Central Friesland, which is the part of Friesland between Vlie and Lauwers.  Friesland is now a province of the Netherlands  He ruled in the name of Louis the German in the era when the Jutish Vikings dominated the Netherlands.

In 873, the Viking Rodulf Haraldsson made a predatory raid on Oostergo. The people organised themselves with the help of a Christian Norman to resist the invaders.     Rodulf was killed in the battle.  Herre Halbertsma has argued that the battle would have occurred around the church of Dokkum.

References
Annalen van Fulda, Luit van der Tuuk (Gjallar)
, Het rijk van de Friese koningen, (Realm of the Frisian kings) (Utrecht, 2000).
, Skiednis fan Fryslân, (History of Friesland) (Grou, 1965), page 109. (Grevenammen).

Medieval Frisian rulers